The Accountant is a 2016 American action-thriller film directed by Gavin O'Connor, written by Bill Dubuque and starring Ben Affleck, Anna Kendrick, J. K. Simmons, Jon Bernthal, Cynthia Addai-Robinson, Jeffrey Tambor, and John Lithgow. The storyline follows Christian Wolff, a certified public accountant with high-functioning autism who makes his living uncooking the books of criminal and terrorist organizations around the world that are experiencing internal embezzlement.

The Accountant premiered in Los Angeles on October 10, 2016, and was theatrically released in the United States by Warner Bros. Pictures on October 14, 2016. Receiving mixed reviews from critics, the film grossed $155 million worldwide. It received praise for Affleck’s performance and the action sequences featuring pencak silat, an Indonesian martial art.

Plot
Christian Wolff is a young man diagnosed with autism. His mother wants to send him to Harbor Neuroscience, a treatment center, but his father disagrees. Unable to handle Christian's needs, his mother abandons their family. His father begins training him and his brother Braxton in various martial-arts while also encouraging Christian to acclimate himself to stimulus that triggers him rather than avoiding it.

In the present, Christian operates a small accounting office in Plainfield, Illinois, that serves as a front for his money laundering enterprise. His criminal clients contact him via an unnamed woman, who also organizes his business. Chris is hired to audit the firm Living Robotics after the company's CEO Lamar Blackburn and his sister Rita learn of accounting irregularities. They assign in-house accountant Dana Cummings to assist Wolff as she discovered the issue.

Meanwhile, Treasury Director Ray King meets with a data analyst named Marybeth Medina who has a criminal record as a juvenile but failed to disclose this on her employment application. King warns Medina she faces prison if he chooses to reveal the information, and he assigns her the task of finding Wolff's real identity before King retires in a few months. She uses this information provided by King along with tax records to locate Wolff's office.

Wolff reviews more than a decade of the company's financial records in one night and finds that $61 million has been embezzled. He informs Rita of the total but admits he does not know who the thief is. That night, Living Robotics CFO Ed Chilton is forced by a hitman to overdose on his insulin. The next day, Lamar pays Wolff the rest of his contract money for the audit and tells him to leave.

Hitmen attempt to kill Wolff but he easily subdues them; one reveals that Dana is the next target. He arrives at Dana's apartment in time to stop more hitmen from killing her. He takes her to his storage unit, which contains an Airstream recreational vehicle filled with artwork and valuables that he has accepted as payment. He then hides Dana at an expensive hotel and goes to confront Rita but finds her murdered, causing him to suspect Lamar is the thief.

King, Medina, and a group of agents search Wolff's home. After everyone else leaves, King tells Medina what he knows of Wolff and reveals that he began getting tips from Wolff. He asks Medina to take over when he retires and to continue accepting Wolff's information. She refuses, unable to justify taking tips from a murderer like Wolff. The phone in the empty house rings, and Medina answers. Wolff's partner gives her a tip about Living Robotics.

Wolff goes to Lamar's mansion, where a team of hitmen await. He fights his way inside but is shocked to find his brother Braxton is the one protecting Lamar. The brothers fight and then reconcile, and afterwards Lamar appears and tries to justify his criminal actions. Christian kills Lamar and makes arrangements to meet up with Braxton in a week before leaving.

Another set of parents visit Harbor Neuroscience. They meet Justine, the daughter of the clinic's director, who is revealed to be Wolff's partner. Medina accepts her new role as Wolff's contact and speaks at a press conference on the Treasury investigation into Living Robotics. Dana receives a framed copy of Dogs Playing Poker, but discovers an original Jackson Pollock painting hidden underneath it. In the final scene, Wolff is shown driving off to a new town with his Airstream in tow.

Cast 

 Ben Affleck as Christian Wolff/The Accountant, an accountant with high-functioning autism who launders money for some of the most dangerous criminals in the world.
 Seth Lee as Young Chris
 Anna Kendrick as Dana Cummings, an accountant at Living Robotics who notices the irregularities with their books.  
 J. K. Simmons as Raymond "Ray" King, the Director of the Treasury Department's FinCEN.  King built a career out of following leads from The Accountant after meeting him years earlier on a stakeout.  
 Jon Bernthal as Braxton Wolff, Christian's brother.  He operates a security company while also working as a fixer for high-profile clients.  
 Jake Presley as Young Braxton
 Cynthia Addai-Robinson as Marybeth Medina, a young Treasury agent who is tasked with finding The Accountant's real identity.  
 Jeffrey Tambor as Francis Silverberg, a former bookkeeper for the Mafia, he trains The Accountant on how to launder money while they were incarcerated together.
 John Lithgow as Lamar Blackburn, the CEO of Living Robotics.
 Jean Smart as Rita Blackburn, Lamar's sister who hires Wolff to inspect the company's books.
 Andy Umberger as Ed Chilton, CFO of Living Robotics.  
 Alison Wright as Justine, Wolff's partner.  She has nonverbal autism and communicates with others via her computer.  She handles Wolff's tech needs and calls in his tips to Ray King.  
 Izzy Fenech as Young Justine
 Robert C. Treveiler as Mr. Wolff/The Colonel, Christian and Braxton's father.  A US Army PSYOP officer who trained his sons in combat from an early age.
 Mary Kraft as Mrs. Wolff, The Colonel's ex-wife.  She walked out on her family because she was unable to deal with Christian's autism.
 Gary Basaraba as Don
 Fernando Chien as Sorkis

Production

Casting
On November 12, 2014, Variety reported that Anna Kendrick was in early talks to co-star in the film, alongside Affleck. Later that day, J. K. Simmons was also announced as being in talks to join the cast. On November 14, 2014, Jon Bernthal was also in talks. On January 6, 2015, Variety reported that Cynthia Addai-Robinson was added to the cast. On January 14, 2015, Jeffrey Tambor and John Lithgow were added to the cast of the film.

Filming
Principal photography began on January 19, 2015, in Atlanta, Georgia. On March 16–20, filming was taking place at the Georgia Institute of Technology. Filming wrapped on April 2, 2015.

Fight choreography
The action sequences in the film featured the Indonesian martial art Pencak silat.

Marketing
On July 9, 2015, it had received graphic novelization published by Vertigo, a limited comic-book imprint owned by Warner Bros. Pictures. The film's official trailer was released on YouTube on May 12, 2016. It features the song "Everything In Its Right Place" by Radiohead.

Release 
The film was released in the United States on October 14, 2016. Before that, Warner Bros. had scheduled it for January 29, 2016 and October 7, 2016. It held its European premiere in London on October 17, 2016.

Home media
The Accountant was released on Digital HD on December 27, 2016, and on Blu-ray and DVD on January 10, 2017. Between January and March 2017, the film sold 463,367 DVDs and 313,279	Blu-rays for a total of $19.2 million. In April 2018, the MPAA reported it was the top-rented film of 2017 for both disc and digital.

Reception

Box office
The Accountant grossed $86.3 million in the United States and Canada and $68.9 million in other countries, for a worldwide total of $155.2 million, against a production budget of $44 million.

The Accountant was released alongside Max Steel and Kevin Hart: What Now?, and was expected to gross $20–25 million from 3,332 theaters in its opening weekend, although the studio was projecting a conservative $15 million opening. The film made $1.35 million from its Thursday-night previews, more than Affleck's Gone Girl ($1.2 million) in 2014. It grossed $9.1 million on its first day and $24.7 million in its opening weekend, finishing first at the box office and was the second-highest debut for a thriller of Affleck's career, behind Gone Girl ($37.5 million). In its second weekend, the film grossed $13.6 million (a drop of 44.8%), finishing fourth at the box office.

Critical response
On Rotten Tomatoes, the film holds an approval rating of 52% based on 282 reviews, with an average rating of 5.67/10. The website's critical consensus reads: "The Accountant writes off a committed performance from Ben Affleck, leaving viewers with a scattershot action thriller beset by an array of ill-advised deductions." On Metacritic, which assigns a normalized rating, the film has a weighted average score of 51 out of 100, based on reviews from 45 critics, indicating "mixed or average reviews". Audiences polled by CinemaScore gave the film an average grade of "A" on an A+ to F scale, while PostTrak reported filmgoers gave it an 84% overall positive score and a 64% "definite recommend".

Vince Mancini of Uproxx gave the film a positive review, writing, "It's transparent in its attempt both to pimp a future franchise and give autistic kids their own superhero. There's a genuine sweetness to the latter that converts me on the former. Headshots, math problems, and pained social interactions? Sign me up. Of the two movies Ben Affleck has been in so far this year, The Accountant and Batman v Superman, The Accountant has by far the most franchise potential." Richard Roeper of the Chicago Sun-Times gave the film 3.5 out of 4 stars, saying: "Madness abounds in The Accountant, an intense, intricate, darkly amusing, and action-infused thriller that doesn't always add up, but who cares, it's BIG FUN."

Richard Brody of The New Yorker panned the film, stating: "This thrill-free thriller...piles up plotlines like an overbuilt house of cards that comes crashing down at the first well-earned guffaw of ridicule."

Accolades

Sequel
In June 2017, a sequel was announced to be in development, with Gavin O'Connor and Bill Dubuque returning in their respective roles as director and writer. Affleck was to return in the starring role. In February 2020, Affleck reiterated his desire for a sequel, also noting the possibility of a television series based on the character.

In September 2021, O'Connor announced that deals for the sequel had just been made.

See also 
 Autism spectrum disorders in the media
 Mental calculators in fiction

References

External links 
 
 
 
 

2016 action thriller films
2016 drama films
2016 films
2016 martial arts films
2010s American films
2010s English-language films
American action thriller films
American martial arts films
Dune Entertainment films
Films about accountants
Films about assassinations
Films about autism
Films about brothers
Films about dysfunctional families
Films about security and surveillance
Films about the United States Army's psychological operations units
Films directed by Gavin O'Connor
Films scored by Mark Isham
Films set in 1989
Films set in 2016
Films set in Illinois
Films set in Washington, D.C.
Films shot in Atlanta
Warner Bros. films